The 1975 NCAA Division I Wrestling Championships were the 45th NCAA Division I Wrestling Championships to be held. Princeton University in Princeton, New Jersey hosted the tournament at Jadwin Gymnasium.

Iowa took home the team championship with 102 points and two individual champions.

Mike Frick of Lehigh was named the Most Outstanding Wrestler and Bill Kalkbrenner of Oklahoma received the Gorriaran Award.

Team results

Individual finals

References

NCAA Division I Wrestling Championship
NCAA
Wrestling competitions in the United States
NCAA Division I Wrestling Championships
NCAA Division I Wrestling Championships
NCAA Division I  Wrestling Championships